The Military ranks of El Salvador are the military insignia used by the Armed Forces of El Salvador.

Commissioned officer ranks
The rank insignia of commissioned officers.

Other ranks
The rank insignia of non-commissioned officers and enlisted personnel.

References

External links
 

El Salvador
Military of El Salvador